The 2015–16 Super League Greece was the 80th season of the highest tier in league of Greek football and the tenth under its current title. The season started on 22 August 2015 and ended in May 2016. The league comprised fourteen teams from the 2014–15 season and two promoted from the 2014–15 Football League. Olympiacos won their sixth consecutive title and 43rd overall, making a record collection of points (85 out of 90) in a championship of 30 games.

Teams
Four teams were relegated from the 2014–15 season. Kerkyra and Ergotelis play in Football League for the 2015–16 season. Niki Volos and OFI will play in Gamma Ethniki.

Two teams were promoted from the 2014–15 Football League, champions AEK Athens and Iraklis, two teams with a long history in the top championship of Greece.

Stadiums and locations

Personnel and kits

Note: Flags indicate national team as has been defined under FIFA eligibility rules. Players and Managers may hold more than one non-FIFA nationality.

Managerial changes

Regular season

League table

Results

Positions by round
The table lists the positions of teams after each week of matches. In order to preserve chronological evolvements, any postponed matches are not included in the round at which they were originally scheduled, but added to the full round they were played immediately afterwards. For example, if a match is scheduled for matchday 13, but then postponed and played between days 16 and 17, it will be added to the standings for day 16.

Play-offs
In the play-off for Champions League, the four qualified teams play each other in a home-and-away round robin. However, they do not all start with 0 points: instead, a weighting system applies to the teams' standing at the start of the play-off mini-league. The team finishing in fifth in the Super League will start the play-off with 0 points. Its end-of-season tally of points is then used to calculate the number of points with which the other teams will start the play-offs: more specifically, each of the three other teams participating in the play-offs will have the fifth-placed team's total points tally subtracted from their own points tally and then divided by five – giving the final figure.

Season statistics
Updated to games played 17 April 2016

Top scorers

Top assists

Best goal and MVP awards winners

Awards

Annual awards
Annual awards were announced on 30 January 2017.

Player of the Year  
The Player of the Year awarded to  Kostas Fortounis (Olympiacos)

Foreign Player of the Year  
The Foreign Player of the Year awarded to  Marcus Berg (Panathinaikos)

Top goalscorer of the Year  
The Top goalscorer of the Year awarded to  Kostas Fortounis (Olympiacos)

Greek Player of the Year  
The Greek Player of the Year awarded to  Kostas Fortounis (Olympiacos)

Manager of the Year 

The Manager of the Year awarded to  Marinos Ouzounidis (Panionios)

Breakthrough of the Year 

The Breakthrough of the Year awarded to  Charis Charisis (PAOK)

Team of the Year 

Goalkeeper: 
 Roberto Jimenez (Olympiacos)
Defence:
 Rodrigo Galo (AEK Athens),
 Georgios Tzavellas (PAOK),
 Rodrigo Moledo (Panathinaikos),
 Arthur Masuaku (Olympiacos)
Midfield:
 Garry Rodriguez (PAOK),
 Carlos Zeca (Panathinaikos),
 Kostas Fortounis (Olympiacos), 
 Manolis Siopis (Panionios),  Anastasios Bakasetas (Panionios) 
Attack:
  Marcus Berg (Panathinaikos)

Attendances
Average attendances counted officially without games played behind closed gates from Superleague.

References

External links
Official website 

Greece
1
A1 Ethniki
A1 Ethniki
2015-16